The chestnut munia or black-headed munia (Lonchura atricapilla) is a small passerine. It was formerly considered conspecific with the closely related tricoloured munia, but is now widely recognized as a separate species. This estrildid finch is a resident breeding bird in Bangladesh, Brunei, Cambodia, China, India, Indonesia, Laos, Malaysia, Burma, Nepal, the Philippines, Singapore, Taiwan, Thailand, Vietnam and Hawaii. It also has been introduced to all the Greater Antilles and Martinique in the Caribbean.

Before 1995, it was the national bird of the Philippines, 
where it is known as mayang pula ("red maya") because of its brick red patch on the lower back which is visible only when it flies. (This distinguishes it from other birds locally called maya, notably the predominantly brownish "mayang simbahan" (tree sparrow) which is more common in urban areas.)

Subspecies
The chestnut munia has several subspecies that are recognized, including:
 Lonchura atricapilla atricapilla
 Lonchura atricapilla rubroniger
 Lonchura atricapilla sinensis
 Lonchura atricapilla formosana
 Lonchura atricapilla deignani
 Lonchura atricapilla brunneiceps
 Lonchura atricapilla jagori
 Lonchura atricapilla selimbauensis
 Lonchura atricapilla obscura
 Lonchura atricapilla batakana

Description 

Small, sexes alike, races differ slightly in intensity of color. in jagori Ad whole head, breast center of belly, and undertail coverts black; back,  wing, and sides of belly chestnut, brighter on underparts, duller on wings; uppertail coverts dark reddish brown, underpart buff; uppertail coverts and tail as ad. Bill silvery gray; eye chestnut; legs gray.

Habitat

The chestnut munia is a small gregarious bird which feeds mainly on grain and other seeds. It frequents open grassland and cultivation.  The nest is a large domed grass structure in a bush or tall grass into which 4-7 white eggs are laid.

Characteristics
The chestnut munia is 11–12 cm in length. The adult has a stubby pale grey-blue bill, black head, and brown body, with a brick red patch on the lower back, visible only when it flies. Some races also have a black belly.

The sexes are similar, but immature birds have uniform pale brown upperparts, lack the dark head and have white to pale buff underparts.

National bird of the Philippines until 1995 
The black-headed munia was the national bird of the Philippines until 1995, when that honorific was transferred to the Philippine eagle. There, due to urbanization and the resulting lack of awareness of local species, it is nowadays often confused for the Eurasian tree sparrow because that species, one of several also categorized as "maya" in the Philippines, is much more common in the urban areas.

References

 A Guide to the birds of the philippines(2000) Robert S. Kennedy pedro C. Gonzales, Edward C, Dickinson Hector C. Miranda, jr. & Timothy H. Fisher

 Birds of India by Grimmett, Inskipp and Inskipp, 
 Munias and Mannikins by Robin Restall,

External links
BirdLife Species Factsheet

chestnut munia
Birds of East India
Birds of Bangladesh
Birds of South China
Birds of Southeast Asia
Birds of the Dominican Republic
chestnut munia
chestnut munia